Royal York Hotel may refer to:

Fairmont Royal York, hotel in Toronto, Canada
The Principal York, hotel in England formerly known as the York Royal Station Hotel